Jewel Brown (born August 30, 1937) is an American jazz and blues singer.

In 2013, Brown was nominated for a Blues Music Award in the 'Koko Taylor Award (Traditional Blues Female)' category.

Discography

As leader
 Show Time  (Fantasy, 1988)
 Milton Hopkins & Jewel Brown (Dialtone, 2012)
 Rollercoaster Boogie (Dynaflow, 2014)

As guest
With Louis Armstrong 
Best Live Concert 1: Jazz in Paris (Verve)

Videos
With Louis Armstrong: Louis Armstrong - Live in Australia (DVD) (Euroarts)

References

External links

Biography and archives at Houston Public Library

1937 births
Living people
20th-century African-American women singers
American women jazz singers
American jazz singers
American blues singers
Musicians from Houston
Singers from Texas
Jazz musicians from Texas
21st-century African-American women singers